Platyna is a genus of flies in the family Stratiomyidae.

Species
Platyna hastata (Fabricius, 1805)

References

Stratiomyidae
Brachycera genera
Taxa named by Christian Rudolph Wilhelm Wiedemann
Diptera of Africa